Thottea is a genus of flowering plants in the pipevine family, Aristolochiaceae.

Accepted species
Plants of the World Online currently includes:

 Thottea abrahamii Dan, P.J.Mathew, Unnithan & Pushp.
 Thottea adichilthottiana Sunil & Naveen Kum.
 Thottea anthonysamyi T.L.Yao
 Thottea barberi (Gamble) Ding Hou
 Thottea beccarii Ding Hou
 Thottea borneensis Valeton
 Thottea celebica Ding Hou
 Thottea curvisemen Ding Hou
 Thottea dalzellii (Hook.f.) Karthik. & Moorthy
 Thottea dependens (Planch.) Klotzsch
 Thottea dinghoui Swarupan.
 Thottea duchartrei Sivar., A.Babu & Balach.
 Thottea grandiflora Rottb.type species (Myanmar to Peninsular Malaysia)
 Thottea hainanensis (Merr. & Chun) Ding Hou
 Thottea idukkiana Pandur. & V.J.Nair
 Thottea kamarudiniana T.L.Yao
 Thottea longipedunculata T.L.Yao
 Thottea macrantha (Boerl.) Ding Hou
 Thottea macrophylla Becc.
 Thottea muluensis Ding Hou
 Thottea papilionis T.L.Yao
 Thottea parviflora Ridl.
 Thottea paucifida Ding Hou
 Thottea penitilobata Ding Hou
 Thottea philippinensis Quisumb.
 Thottea piperiformis (Griff.) Mabb.
 Thottea piscodora T.L.Yao
 Thottea ponmudiana Sivar.
 Thottea praetermissa T.L.Yao
 Thottea racemosa (Lour.) Ding Hou
 Thottea reflexa T.L.Yao
 Thottea reniloba Ding Hou
 Thottea rhizantha Becc.
 Thottea ruthiae T.L.Yao
 Thottea sasidharaniana Robi
 Thottea siliquosa (Lam.) Ding Hou
 Thottea sivarajanii E.S.S.Kumar, A.E.S.Khan & Binu
 Thottea straatmanii Ding Hou
 Thottea sumatrana (Merr.) Ding Hou
 Thottea terengganuensis T.L.Yao
 Thottea tomentosa (Blume) Ding Hou (Indochina, W. Malesia)
 Thottea tricornis Maingay ex Hook.f.
 Thottea triserialis Ding Hou

References

External links

Aristolochiaceae